Truth Beyond... is the third album by Canadian death metal band Neuraxis. It was released on November 1, 2002, by Canadian music labels Neoblast and Galy Records. It was re-released through Morbid Records in 2003.

Track listing

Personnel

Neuraxis
Ian Campbell – vocals
Steven Henry – guitars
Robin Milley – guitars, 12 string acoustic guitar
Yan Thiel – bass
Alexandre Erian – drums

Additional musicians
Lenzig Leal – backing vocals on "Impulse", "Fractionized", "Xenobiotic", "Neurasthenic"
Zac Joe – backing vocals on "Impulse", "Essence", "Neurasthenic"
Jawsh Mullen – backing vocals on "Impulse", "Neurasthenic"
Steve Marois – backing vocals on "Impulse", "Fractionized"
Youri – backing vocals on "Impulse", "Structures"

Production
Yannick St-Amand – mixing, mastering, sound engineering
Bernard Belley – mastering

Additional personnel
Mike Harrison – artwork
Pat Loisel – lyrics revision
Robin Milley – lyrics revision
Steven Henry – cover concept, computer layout
Louis-Charles Levasseur – photography
Melissa Malboeuf – photography

References

2002 albums
Neuraxis (band) albums
Galy Records albums